Tullybelton is a hamlet located in the Scottish county of Perth and Kinross about  north-northeast of Perth.

Ian Fraser, Baron Fraser of Tullybelton took the name of this hamlet as his title, when he was elevated to being a Lord of Appeal in Ordinary.

Villages in Perth and Kinross